Nidelva is the main river in the Arendal drainage basin in Agder county, Norway. The confluence is located by the village of Haugsjåsund in Nissedal municipality in southern Vestfold og Telemark county. The river flows south into the Skagerrak at the city of Arendal.

Watercourse
The river flows through Nissedal in Vestfold og Telemark county briefly before entering Agder county.  It then flows through Åmli municipality.  The river Gjøv joins the Nidelva there.  The large lake Nelaug is a man-made lake along the river that is used for power generation. It continues through Froland municipality and then Arendal municipality.  For a while, the river forms the border between Grimstad and Arendal municipalities.  The river empties into the Skaggerak just northeast of Rykene in the town of Arendal between the mainland and the island of Hisøya.

There are sixteen hydro-electric power stations are built along the river, making this one of Norway's most controlled drainage systems.  The largest on the river are at Rygene in Grimstad, Evenstad in Froland, and Jørundland in Åmli. Salmon can be found from the mouth to as far as  up the river, where the Evenstad power station is located, effectively blocking their path further upstream.

Name
The name of the river possibly comes from the Old Norse word niðr which means "the river that is lying down".  It may also come from the Latin word nitere.  The name of the river also may lend itself to several other local names along the river such as Nisser, Nedenes, and Nelaug.

Media gallery

References

External links

Evenstad power station 

Rivers of Agder
Rivers of Vestfold og Telemark
Grimstad
Arendal
Froland
Åmli
Nissedal